Roger Best (born 18 March 1974) is a former rugby league footballer who played the position of .

Best has previously played for London Broncos in the Super League and is the father of Newcastle Knights back, Bradman Best.

External links
Rugby League Project stats

1974 births
Living people
English rugby league players
London Broncos players
Rugby articles needing expert attention
Rugby league second-rows